Poecilasthena burmensis is a moth in the family Geometridae that is found in Burma.

References

Moths described in 1926
Poecilasthena
Moths of Asia